The 110th Aviation Brigade is an aviation brigade of the United States Army conducting all flight training under the United States Army Aviation Center of Excellence at Fort Rucker, Alabama. It consists of a Headquarters, an academics section, a night vision device section, four subordinate battalions, and an Army Reserve Augmentation Brigade Headquarters:

 1st Battalion, 11th Aviation Regiment
 1st Battalion, 14th Aviation Regiment, Hanchey Army Heliport (AH-64D/E)
 1st Battalion, 212th Aviation Regiment, Lowe Army Heliport and Shell Army Heliport (UH-60A/L/M & OH-58C)
 1st Battalion, 223rd Aviation Regiment, Cairns Army Airfield and Knox Army Heliport (CH-47D/F & Mi-17)

History 
The 10th Aviation Group was activated on 30 June 1965 and evolved from the 10th Air Transport Brigade (Test). It supported the 11th Airborne Division (Air Assault). When the 11th was disbanded, the 10th remained at Fort Benning, Ga., to provide all aspects of training for Aviation companies preparing to deploy to Vietnam. The 10th Aviation Group was inactivated and redesignated back to the 10th Aviation Group in 2004. On 1 March 2005, the 10th Aviation Group was redesignated as the 110th Aviation Brigade. The Aviation Training Brigade at Fort Rucker assumed this unit designation and lineage on the same day. The mission of the 110th is to provide the Army and allied forces with professionally trained Aviators and non-rated crew members through planning, coordinating, and executing formal flight instruction at the undergraduate and graduate level.

The brigade also provides crash rescue and air ambulance support to USAACE and surrounding communities and serves as the Department of the Army Night Vision Device Training and Operations Staff Agency.

1st Battalion, 11th Aviation Regiment

The 1-11th Aviation Regiment, reassigned to 110th Aviation Brigade in October 2010, provides air traffic services for all aviation training for U.S. Army Aviation Center of Excellence—including the operation of the Army’s largest Radar Approach Control.

1st Battalion, 14th Aviation Regiment

The 1-14th Aviation Regiment at Hanchey Army Heliport trains Aviators in the Boeing AH-64D/E Apache

1st Battalion, 223rd Aviation Regiment

The 1-223rd Aviation Regiment at Cairns Army Airfield and Knox AHP trains Aviators and flight engineers in the Boeing CH-47D/F Chinook aircraft, primary and instrument evaluations, and all Beechcraft C-12 Huron fixed-wing qualification courses.

C Company, 1-223rd Aviation Regiment (formerly 3-210th Aviation Regiment), conducts training in the Mil Mi-17 (NATO reporting name: Hip) helicopters.

1st Battalion, 212th Aviation Regiment

The 1-212th Aviation Regiment at Lowe AHP and Shell AHP trains Aviators in the Sikorsky UH-60A/L/M Black Hawk aircraft and provides evaluation flights for the Initial Entry Rotary Wing students' basic combat skills phases of training. B Company, 1-212th Aviation Regiment (formerly the 2-210th Helicopter School Battalion), trains Spanish students in the UH-60 and Bell OH-58C Kiowa aircraft at Lowe and Shell AHPs.

Lineage 
Constituted 30 June 1965 in the Regular Army as Headquarters and Headquarters Company, 10th Aviation Group Activated 1 July 1965 at Fort Benning, Georgia

Inactivated 15 May 1970 at Fort Benning, Georgia

Activated 15 October 1991 at Fort Bragg, North Carolina

Redesignated 16 September 1992 as Headquarters and Headquarters Company, 229th Aviation Group

Inactivated 15 September 2004 at Fort Bragg, North Carolina, and concurrently redesignated as Headquarters and Headquarters Company, 10th Aviation Group Redesignated 1 March 2005 as Headquarters and Headquarters Company, 110th Aviation Brigade

Headquarters concurrently transferred to the United States Army Training and Doctrine Command and activated at Fort Rucker, Alabama

Decorations 
  Army Superior Unit Award, Streamer embroidered 1997

Commanders

References

External links

Lineage And Honors Information 

110
Military units and formations established in 2005